Thappalampuliyur is a village situated 5 km south east of Thiruvarur in Tamil Nadu, India.

External links
 http://sites.google.com/site/thappalampuliyur/

Villages in Tiruvarur district